The Queen City Balladeers is a non-profit folk music organization in Cincinnati, Ohio. It was established in 1963 by a group of students at the University of Cincinnati, and for over forty years have been sponsoring and promoting folk and acoustic music in the Greater Cincinnati area.  It is a non-profit, all-volunteer organization, and its membership includes a wide variety of people from all backgrounds and age groups.  Many Balladeers are also part or full-time musicians, writers, instrument makers and sound technicians as well as avid fans of folk, acoustic and world music.

The Leo Coffeehouse, founded by QCB members, is the longest-running folk venue in the Midwest and was also started in 1963.  For years it was held in the basement of the University of Cincinnati YMCA.  It was moved to Old St. George's Church in Corryville in 1999, and in 2006 was moved to the Zion United Church of Christ in Norwood, Ohio. In February, 2014, the Leo moved to Mt. Healthy United Methodist Church, 7612 Perry Street In Mt. Healthy. In September 2015 Leo Coffeehouse returned to Zion United Church of Christ in Norwood.

The Leo Coffeehouse is run entirely by the Queen City Balladeers volunteers, and is held every Sunday evening from September through May. Many nationally known artists like John Denver, John McCutcheon, Utah Phillips, Jean Ritchie and even Jerry Springer have performed at Leo, but the coffeehouse is mainly an outlet for the many Tri-state area artists.  These artists love performing to a "listening room" such as Leo, so they willing perform free of charge.  Leo is an incredible place for an evening of high-quality entertainment.

The Balladeers also sponsor and assist with other local music events, such as Edensong (held in Cincinnati's historic and beautiful Eden Park, Cincinnati each Friday in July), the Appalachian Festival (held at Coney Island), and many other festivals and concerts in the Tri-State area.

References

External links
 

American folk music
1963 establishments in Ohio
Musical groups from Cincinnati